The Clemson Tigers baseball program is a college baseball team that represents Clemson University in the Atlantic Division of the Atlantic Coast Conference in the National Collegiate Athletic Association. The team has had 28 head coaches since it started playing organized baseball in the 1896 season. The current coach is Erik Bakich, who took over the head coaching position in 2023.

Bill Wilhelm is the all-time leader in games coached (1,707), seasons coached (36), and total wins (1,161). John Heisman has the highest winning percentage of any Tiger coach with a 28–6–1 record (.814) in his three years in Clemson. R. T. V. Bowman has the lowest winning percentage (.250 in two seasons). 

In 2011, Wilhelm was inducted into the National College Baseball Hall of Fame.

Key

Coaches

Notes

References
General

Specific

Lists of college baseball head coaches in the United States

Clemson Tigers baseball coaches